Lalab (Sundanese: , Lalab) or lalap/lalapan (Indonesian) is a Sundanese raw vegetable salad served with sambal terasi. It is a popular Sundanese vegetable dish originated from West Java & Banten, Indonesia.

There are no set rules on what vegetables make into lalab, in practice all edible vegetables can be made as lalab. However, the most common raw vegetables are cucumber, tomato, cabbage, lettuce, lemon basil, leunca and long beans. While blanched or boiled vegetables include spinach, papaya leaves and chayote. The dressing for this salad usually is sambal terasi served directly from the stone mortar as a spicy dipping sauce for these assorted raw vegetables.

Today, lalab is popular throughout Indonesia. It is usually served as vegetable side dish next to the main course, such as ayam goreng (fried chicken), ayam bakar (grilled chicken), pepes, pecel lele (fried catfish), fried gourami, and many other ikan goreng (fried fish) or ikan bakar (grilled fish).

History
The history of lalab vegetables is obscure, due to lack of historical records. In the 15th century Old Sundanese manuscript Sanghyang Siksa Kandang Karesian it was mentioned the common flavour of food in that times are, lawana (salty), kaduka (hot and spicy), tritka (bitter), amba (sour), kasaya (succulent), and madura (sweet). These tastes are native flavour which mostly acquired from plant and vegetables.

Ingredients
 
Originally, it was made from any available edible young leaves and raw vegetables known by Sundanese since ancient times. Today, though, most lalab consists of sliced cabbage, cucumbers, lettuce, green beans, yardlong beans, tomatoes, leunca, lemon basil, spinach, water spinach, pohpohan leaves (Pilea melastomoides), kenikir leaves (cosmos), cassava leaves, papaya leaves, chayote, and small, green eggplant. Sometimes, other exotic vegetables also are used, such as green, stinky petai and jengkol bean.

Although most lalab vegetables are only washed in cold water and served raw, some boiled, steamed and fried variations are also available; for example, petai green beans can be served either raw or fried, while labu siam (chayote), water spinach and cassava leaves are usually served boiled.

While most of vegetables are served raw or simply boiled or blanched, the main flavouring agent is its dressing, the hot and spicy sambal terasi which is chili paste in terasi shrimp paste. Most of recipes revolved around specific recipe of sambals.

Nutrients

In Indonesian cuisine, lalab often served as garnishing or as vegetable accompaniment to the main meal of fish or chicken; such as ayam goreng (fried chicken) or pecel lele (fried catfish). Lalab is rich in vitamins, minerals and fiber. Daily consumption of fresh vegetables is good for reducing cholesterol levels and improving digestive health. Vegetables are also rich in antioxidants, which contribute to fighting free radicals, and have antiaging and anticancer properties. Several plants used in lalab also are believed to have certain medicinal properties.

See also

Ulam, a similar Malay dish consists of vegetables, served raw or soaked in hot water
 List of salads
 Ngapi yay, a similar dish in Burmese cuisine
 Nam phrik, a similar dish in Thai cuisine

References

External links

 Sambal lalap recipes 
 Sambal lalap video

Sundanese cuisine
Salads
Vegetarian dishes of Indonesia
Vegetable dishes of Indonesia